Estádio Bruno Lazzarini is an association football stadium in Leme, on the countryside of São Paulo, Brazil. The stadium holds 7.000 people. It was inaugurated in 1980.

Is the currently venue of Lemense FC (former SC Atibaia) that moved from Atibaia to Leme in 2022.

References

Bruno Lazzarini
Bruno Lazzarini